Dioïla Cercle is an administrative subdivision of the Koulikoro Region of Mali.  Its seat is the town of Dioïla. It lies at the southeast corner of the region, and prior to 1977, it was combined with what is now Kati Cercle and the District of Bamako  in the "Bamako Cercle", with the capital city as its seat.

The Dioïla Cercle is divided into 23 communes:

Banco(containing the town of Dioïla)
Benkadi
Binko
Dégnékoro
Diébé
Diédougou
Diouman
Dolendougou
Guégnéka
Jékafo
Kaladougou
Kémékafo
Kéréla
Kilidougou
Massigui
N'Dlondougou
N'Garadougou
N'Golobougou
Nangola
Niantjila
Ténindougou
Wacoro
Zan Coulibaly

Dioïla Cercle is home to primarily Bambara and Malinke farmers, and formed part of the pre-colonial Bambara Empire. Because of this, and its rural character, Animism persisted in this  area well into the 20th century.  There are also populations of Muslim Maraka, Fula, and Bozo fishing communities. The Cercle falls largely south of the dryer Sahel land, in the wetter Sudan.   It is also home to the headwaters of the Bani River.

References

Cercles of Mali
Koulikoro Region